Victoria District was a federal electoral district in British Columbia, Canada, that was represented in the House of Commons of Canada from 1871 to 1872.

History 

It was created at the time of that province's entry into Confederation in 1871.  It was composed of all of the Victoria, Esquimalt and Saanich districts as defined at the time.  In 1872, it was abolished, and replaced by Victoria riding.  As there was no general federal election including the new BC seats until 1872, the original Members of Parliament (MPs) from BC were elected in a special byelection held on 20 September 1871.

Members of Parliament 

In Victoria District, there were only two candidates for the two-seat riding, so both members entered the House of Commons by acclamation.

One was Premier Amor De Cosmos, who held the seat and its successor for three elected terms as of the 1872 general election.  During his first term, he retained his office as Premier, and during the last, shared the seat with Prime Minister John A. Macdonald.

The other member was Henry Nathan, Jr., a local businessman and the first MP of Jewish heritage.

For the 1872 general election, the Victoria District riding was replaced by Victoria riding.  This was also the case with the similarly-temporary Cariboo District, Yale District, New Westminster District, which were abolished and replaced by ridings without the "District" appellation.

Election results

See also 

 List of Canadian federal electoral districts
 Past Canadian electoral districts

External links
Riding history from the Library of Parliament

Defunct British Columbia federal electoral districts on Vancouver Island